Lucas John Kendall Parsons (born 4 October 1969) is an Australian former professional golfer.

Parsons was born in Orange, New South Wales. As an amateur, he won both the Australian and New Zealand Amateur Championships in 1991. He turned professional the following year and joined the PGA Tour of Australasia.

Parsons won seven tournaments on the PGA Tour of Australasia, including the New Zealand Open in 1995. He played one unsuccessful season on the United States-based PGA Tour in 1996. He also played for a time on the European Tour after graduating from the second tier Challenge Tour in 1999, having won two tournaments and finished 10th on the money list. His best season-end ranking on the European Tour Order of Merit was 37th in 2000, the year he won the Greg Norman Holden International, also a PGA Tour of Australasia event. He finished a career best 2nd on that tour's Order of Merit at the end of the 1999/2000 season.

MasterChef Australia
Having retired from tournament golf at the end of 2008, Parsons now runs a café in Randwick, New South Wales and was a participant in the first season of the competitive cooking television show MasterChef Australia. He hoped to expand his business and open a restaurant. He cooked a Singaporean Chili Crab dish which impressed the judges and helped him progress to the semi-finals. Parsons beat celebrity chef Ben O'Donoghue in the sixth Celebrity Chef Challenge to guarantee himself a place in the finals. He was the first finalist eliminated on 13 July 2009 followed by former competitor Julia Jenkins who also won a celebrity chef challenge.

Amateur wins
1990 Lagonda Trophy (England)
1991 Australian Amateur, New Zealand Amateur, Australian Medal, New South Wales Amateur

Professional wins (9)

European Tour wins (1)

1Co-sanctioned by the PGA Tour of Australasia

PGA Tour of Australasia wins (4)

1Co-sanctioned by the European Tour

PGA Tour of Australasia playoff record (0–1)

Challenge Tour wins (2)

Other wins (3)
1997 Toyota Southern Classic
1997 Queensland PGA Championship (Development Tour)
1998 Queensland PGA Championship (Development Tour)

Results in major championships

Note: Parsons never played in the Masters Tournament or the PGA Championship.

"T" = tied

Results in World Golf Championships

"T" = Tied

Team appearances
Amateur
Nomura Cup (representing Australia): 1991 (winners)
Eisenhower Trophy (representing Australia): 1992
Sloan Morpeth Trophy (representing Australia): 1992
Australian Men's Interstate Teams Matches (representing New South Wales): 1989 (winners), 1990 (winners), 1991 (winners), 1992 (winners)

Professional
World Cup (representing Australia): 2000
Alfred Dunhill Challenge (representing Australasia): 1995

See also
1995 PGA Tour Qualifying School graduates

References

External links

Australian male golfers
PGA Tour golfers
European Tour golfers
PGA Tour of Australasia golfers
Participants in Australian reality television series
MasterChef Australia
People from the Central West (New South Wales)
Golfers from Sydney
1969 births
Living people